Clifton's Cafeteria, once part of a chain of eight Clifton's restaurants, was the oldest surviving cafeteria-style eatery in Los Angeles and the largest public cafeteria in the world when it closed in 2018. Founded in 1931 by Clifford Clinton, the design of the restaurants included exotic decor and facades that were "kitschy and theatrical", and would eventually include multi-story fake redwood trees, stuffed lions, neon plants, and a petrified wood bar. Some considered Clifton's as a precursor to the first tiki bars. The name was created by combining "Clifford" and "Clinton" to produce "Clifton's".

The second Clifton's facility opened in 1935 at 648 S Broadway. In 1939 its name was changed to 'Clifton's Brookdale', and as the sole survivor of the multiple branches over 79 years, it was known as 'Clifton's Cafeteria' or simply as "Clifton's". It had remained in operation for 74 years. The restaurant chain was noted for each facility having its own theme, and for aiding those who could not afford to pay. This approach to business reflected the owner's Christian ethos—he never turned anyone away hungry and maintained a precedent set by the first restaurant on Olive Street, known as "Clifton's Golden Rule". In 1946, Clifford and his wife Nelda sold their cafeteria interests to their three younger Clinton children, and retired to devote their attentions to a Meals for Millions, a non-profit charitable organization he founded in the wake of World War II to distribute food to millions of starving and malnourished people throughout the world.

Clifton's Brookdale was sold to nightclub operator Andrew Meieran on September 21, 2010.  Meieran intended renovations to preserve its unique atmosphere, as well  the restaurant's 1950-style recipes. In February 2012, Meieran said the remodeling was expected to continue for another 18 months. Clifton's Brookdale reopened October 1, 2015. In November 2018, the cafeteria closed for the last time and was replaced by a high end bar called Clifton's Republic.

History

The Clinton family's five generations as California restaurateurs began when David Harrison Clinton came to Los Angeles from Missouri in 1888 and purchased the Southern Hotel and its dining room in downtown Los Angeles.  David's son Edmond settled in San Francisco, where he and his wife Gertrude became co-owners of a group of cafeteria-style restaurants named Dennets.

Clifford, one of Edmond's five children, learned the restaurant trade while working in his father's restaurants. Along with two partners, he bought his father's interest in Dennets. Due to differences in opinion over business practices, he relinquished ownership to his partners and moved to Los Angeles in 1931.

Establishing his restaurants during the height of the Great Depression, and using knowledge gained from working in his family's cafeteria chain in San Francisco, Clinton made a point to never turn anyone away, even if they had no money, seeking to average only a half-cent profit per customer.  During one 90-day period, 10,000 people ate free before he was able to open an emergency "Penny Caveteria" in a basement (hence the modified name) a few blocks away to feed two million patrons during the next two years.

Fare
The restaurants had been cafeteria style with each dish sold on a pay-per-item basis. Featured were fountain soft drinks and classic American fare such as roast beef, brisket, meatloaf, and turkey, with a wide assortment of traditional sides.  Revolving daily specials often included a fish plate and a fried chicken plate, both of which came with mashed potatoes and vegetables, and in keeping with the eatery's retro spirit, there was also a selection of Jello salads, soups, vegetables, breads, and classic desserts such as cakes and pies. Additionally, Clifton's offered vegan options.  Clifton's desserts were voted "Best Desserts" by L.A. Downtown News' readers in 2001.

Branches
Circa 1939, the WPA-sponsored American Guide Series Los Angeles guidebook described the chain thusly: "Clifton’s Brookdale, 648 S. Broadway, and Clifton's Cafeteria of the Golden Rule, 618 S. Olive St. Organ music and singing attendants. A novel feature at both places is the bulletin board just outside the entrance, where listings are displayed for employment, barter, sightseeing, and appeals for congenial friendship. At Brookdale a 'country' atmosphere has been created with artificial trees, vines, brook, and waterfall. Inexpensive."

Founding branch: Clifton's Pacific Seas 

In 1931, Clinton leased a "distressed" cafeteria location at 618 South Olive Street in Los Angeles and founded what his customers referred to as "The Cafeteria of the Golden Rule".  Patrons were obliged to pay only what they felt was fair, according to a neon sign that flashed "PAY WHAT YOU WISH." The cafeteria, at the western terminus of U.S. Route 66, was notable for serving people of all races, and was included in The Negro Motorist Green Book.

In 1939, the founders of Clifton's remodeled the restaurant to change it from a conventional dining establishment to a more exotic setting and renamed it "Clifton's Pacific Seas". The exterior and interior were decorated with 12 waterfalls, volcanic rock, and tropical foliage.  Tiki historian Sven Kirsten claims it had a "sherbert-gushing volcano".

Brightly illuminated in the evening, it became a mecca for tourists and Angelenos alike, often being referred to in the same category as other prominent landmarks of downtown Los Angeles, such as Angels Flight, Olvera Street, and Pershing Square.  Initially, the Los Angeles Architectural Commission was so unhappy with the facade and the decor that they threatened suit.

One of the many interior themes of the Pacific Seas included "The Garden" as a setting done in the period AD 33. The Garden was first conceived by Clifford E. Clinton in 1943 as an interpretation of the famous artist Heinrich Hofmann's Christ in Gethsemane. Clinton commissioned sculptor Marshall Lakey to fashion a life-sized figure of Christ, kneeling in prayer. The mural behind Christ, depicting the city of Jerusalem and the Garden of Gethsemane was painted by artist Einar C. Petersen.

Clifton's Pacific Seas was visited by Jack Kerouac who wrote in On the Road of visiting "a cafeteria downtown which was decorated to look like a grotto, with metal tits spurting everywhere and great impersonal stone buttockses belonging to deities and soapy Neptune. People ate lugubrious meals around the waterfalls, their faces green with marine sorrow".

In 1960, although the three-story structure with its cascading waterfall facade had become a landmark over the preceding 29 years, the original Clifton's Pacific Seas was closed, the building was razed, and the location turned into  a parking lot.

A much smaller version in the form of a side-room bar and named the Pacific Seas resides at their still existing location and pays homage to the original and its history. It is viewed by some as being one of southern California's best Tiki bars.

Last branch: Clifton's Brookdale 

With a motto of "Dine Free Unless Delighted", Clifton's second Golden Rule was opened in 1935 when Clifford Clinton purchased the lease of the former Boos Brothers Cafeteria at 648 S Broadway in Los Angeles.

Having himself spent time as a youth the Santa Cruz Mountains not far from the Brookdale Lodge, he chose to redecorate the facility in 1939 to pattern it after the lodge.  Working with rock sculptor Francois Scotti, Clifford created a 20-foot waterfall "cascading into a quiet stream" which then "meandered" through the dining room, past faux redwood trees used to conceal the room's steel columns.  Renowned Los Angeles muralist, Einar C. Petersen, created a life size forest on canvas to cover one wall, and a small chapel was set among the crags to fulfill Clifford's desire to feed the soul as well as the body of depression-weary Angelinos.  After refurbishment, he renamed the location "Clifton's Brookdale".  The interior included a stuffed moose head, animated raccoons, and a fishing bear.

The restaurant was described as one of the last vestiges of Old Broadway in downtown Los Angeles, with an interior that looks like a "slightly down-at-the-heels Disney version of a twilight forest".  In June 2006, co-owner Robert Clinton took final steps to purchase the Broadway building they had been leasing for 71 years.  With over 600 seats on three floors, and known as "Clifton's Cafeteria", it was noted as the oldest cafeteria in Los Angeles and the largest public cafeteria in the world in 2009. The third floor included a party room, a banquet room, and many pictures of Clifford and Nelda Clinton. There was a secret room on an upper floor. There was also another set of restrooms down the stairs in the bottom basement. The restaurant's busiest period was in the 1940s, with as many as 10,000 customers forming lines down Broadway, but by 2009 Clifton's regularly serves 1,800 to 2,000 daily.

In September 2010, Clifton's Brookdale was sold to nightclub operator Andrew Meieran, who stated that he intends to preserve the food and atmosphere of the establishment.  On September 26, 2011, the cafeteria closed for remodeling, planned then to last three to six months while the restaurant gets a new kitchen and a redesigned serving area.  In February 2012, the remodeling process continued with the "unveiling" of the original 1904 building facade, revealed through the removal of the 1963 aluminum facade.  Meieran estimated that the cafeteria would reopen in about 18 months. During renovations, a partition wall was removed, revealing a neon light that was still switched on, apparently having been lit continuously for 77 years. It may be the oldest continuously illuminated neon light in the world.  The director of the Museum of Neon Art called the discovery "incredible".

The revamped restaurant had multiple eating and drinking establishments inside the building, including a bakery, a version of the original 1935 classic cafeterias on the ground and second floors, an old-school steakhouse on the third floor, and a tiki themed bar on the fourth floor, to be named "South Seas" in honor of the original 1931 facility. The combined-use building will also include a museum called "Clifton’s Cabinet of Curiosities".  While restoration of Clifton's at 648 S. Broadway has had delays, the goal of Andrew Meieran is to re-open the facility in early 2015. The restaurant finally reopened October 1, 2015. The cafeteria was closed permanently in November 2018 and was replaced by a bar called Clifton's Republic.

Lakewood 

In January 1955, it was announced that the Lakewood Center in Lakewood, California, would in 1956 become the location for the third Clifton's cafeteria.  In 2001, after 44 years of service, the restaurant closed the branch due to a business slowdown.

West Covina

Eastland Shopping Center 
In 1958, a Clifton's opened in West Covina, California at the Eastland Shopping Center.  In 1978 Clifton's moved to the West Covina Fashion Plaza, now called Westfield West Covina, where it stayed in business until 2003.

Westfield Shopping Center 
The Greenery

In 1978, after moving from its original West Covina location due to an expiring lease, Clifton's relocated to inside the Westfield Shoppingtown West Covina and renamed itself "The Greenery" for its garden theme.  In 2003 the branch closed, leaving "Clifton's Brookdale" at 7th and Broadway as the last of what was once an 8-store chain.

Century City 

In 1965, ground was broken in Century City, California, for a 1966 opening of a new branch.  The outlet operated for over 20 years before closing at the end of 1986.

Silver Spoon 

In 1975, the company opened "Clifton's Silver Spoon" at 515 W. 7th Street, Los Angeles. The Marshall Lakey statue of Christ, which had been placed in storage upon closure of Pacific Seas in 1960, was returned to display when a new Garden was created in the new location.  In 1997, the Silver Spoon location was closed   and in 1998 the Lakey statue of Christ was relocated to The Holyland Exhibit in Los Angeles.  Scenes for the Brad Pitt film Fight Club were shot in the Silver Spoon's location.

Woodland Hills 

Clifton's opened a branch in Woodland Hills, California and currently operates as an event venue open to the public.

Laguna Hills 
In 1987, Clifton's opened a branch in Laguna Hills, California across from the main entrance to Leisure World. For the 12 years of its operation, senior citizens accounted for 90% of the restaurant's clientele. It closed in 1999, to the dismay of local long-time patrons who frequented it as a gathering place.

Whittier 
In 1971, Clifton's opens at the Whittier Quad shopping center, offering more than 100 à la carte menu items. The theme was Holland, and it was called The Holland House. It featured windmill murals, and a quaint ambiance reminiscent of old Holland.

San Bernardino 
In 1974, Clifton's opened in San Bernardino at the Inland Center Mall.

Reception 
The restaurant has made an impression on many who have visited.  LA Weekly: "...Clifton's Cafeteria, that Depression-era palace of retroville."  Los Angeles Downtown News: "...Clifton's Cafeteria, the kitschy cool L.A. establishment that has been around since 1931".

In Los Angeles Off the Beaten Path, author Lark Ellen Gould describes Clifton's as "part national park kitsch, part Disney nightmare, part Grandma's house with fake squirrels, taxidermied deer, stuffed moose, and faux waterfalls", and it is described by Los Angeles Times as one of the last vestiges of Old Broadway in downtown Los Angeles, with an interior that looks like a "slightly down-at-the-heels Disney version of a twilight forest".

Huell Howser, host and producer of the KCET series Visiting... with Huell Howser, featured Clifton's in one episode, where in 2001 he shared "Nestled in the bustling setting of historic Broadway, Clifton's Cafeteria is truly a 'jewel in the heart of the Jewelry District'". Howser returned in 2009, only to find little change.
Benji Lanyado of The Guardian lists Clifton's as among LA's top 10 cult locations and notes that it "survives as an astonishing woodland fantasia".

Michael Stern of Roadfood wrote that the surviving location of Clifton's was "an amazing place to eat", with a food line that was "immense", noting that choices included fried chicken with buttermilk biscuits, oxtail stew, turkey and dressing, and side dishes ranging from whipped or fried potatoes to 'cranberry jewel gelatin'. He wrote that for those with "fond memories of school lunch", Clifton's offers simple fare such as "grilled cheese sandwiches cooked crisp and pressed flat as a pancake".  He remarked that its current location was in a part of Los Angeles that was once fashionable and wrote, "Once you arrive at Clifton's, though, you can feel the magic that used to be".

The restaurant's uniqueness has also found its way into many books and novels, including The Long Embrace, Violin Dreams,  Don't spit on my corner, A Few Good Women, Deep Heet!, and Remain Silent, among many others.  In the novel Strange Angel, author George Pendel describes Clifton's as "a bizarre experience", and a "kitsch cafeteria provided millions of low-priced meals to the out-of-work and destitute during the darkest days of the depression", and that it provided a "surreal sanctuary from a broken world".

In popular culture
Science fiction author Ray Bradbury ate at Clifton's as a struggling writer, often taking advantage of the policy that anyone who couldn't afford to pay didn't have to, and in the 1930s attended meetings of the Los Angeles Science Fiction Society, which met for years at the restaurant. Author/agent/fan/collector Forrest J Ackerman later wrote, "...we moved to Clifton's Cafeteria, a feature of which was their free limeade and lime juice. Some of the members who didn't have more than a nickel or dime to spend guzzled a lot of that free juice." Bradbury celebrated his 89th birthday at the downtown eatery in 2009.

Charles Bukowski mentions Clifton's Cafeteria in his novel Ham on Rye: "Clifton's Cafeteria was nice. If you didn't have much money, they let you pay what you could. And if you didn't have any money, you didn't have to pay. [...] It was owned by some very nice rich old man, a very unusual person."

The Distillers mention Clifton's in the song "City of Angels" on the album Sing Sing Death House: "Emptiness never sleeps at Clifton's 6 am, with your bag lady friend and your mind descending."

The restaurant was featured in Visiting... with Huell Howser Episode 832.

Michel Butor's 1962 book Mobile includes text from three Clifton's Cafeteria pamphlets.

See also
 Ransom M. Callicott, partner with Clinton and co-owner of Clifton's
 List of defunct restaurants of the United States

References

Further reading

External links

 
 LA Times: "Panorama: Clifton's Cafeteria "

1931 establishments in California
2018 disestablishments in California
Buildings and structures in Downtown Los Angeles
Restaurants established in 1931
Restaurants disestablished in 2018
Restaurants in Los Angeles
Defunct restaurants in Los Angeles